Congenital athymia is a rare immune disorder in which a child is born without a thymus – an organ that plays a critical role in helping the body learn to fight infections. Children impacted by this disease typically die within the first two years of life and may have repeated, often life-threatening infections because they lack adequate working T cells (a kind of infection-fighting white blood cell).

Treatment 
In October 2021, the thymus tissue product Rethymic was approved by U.S. Food and Drug Administration (FDA) as a medical therapy for the treatment of children with congenital athymia. It takes six months or longer to reconstitute the immune function in treated children.

References

Further reading 
 

Congenital disorders
Thymus